Mahalingum Govender (1946 – 27 January 2014) was a South African cricketer. He played 27 first-class matches for Natal between 1971 and 1984.

References

External links
 

1946 births
2014 deaths
South African cricketers
KwaZulu-Natal cricketers
Place of birth missing